Minuscule 681 (in the Gregory-Aland numbering), ε 355 (von Soden), is a Greek minuscule manuscript of the New Testament, on parchment. Palaeographically it has been assigned to the 13th century. The manuscript has complex contents. Scrivener labelled it by 532e.

Description 

The codex contains the text of the four Gospels, on 251 parchment leaves (size ). The text is written in one column per page, 26 lines per page.

The first page being in gold.

Text 

The Greek did not place text of the codex Kurt Aland in any Category.

The manuscript was not examined by using the Claremont Profile Method.

"The text was corrected throughout by an ancient scribe, in a hand bright, clear, and small."

History 

Scrivener and Gregory dated the manuscript to the 13th century. Currently the manuscript is dated by the INTF to the 13th century.

It was added to the list of New Testament manuscript by Scrivener (532) and Gregory (681). It was examined by North, Guildford.

The manuscript was acquired along with seven other manuscripts (556, 676, 677, 678, 679, 680, and 682) by the late Sir Thomas Phillips, at Middle Hill in Worcestershire.

Formerly it was housed at the Sotheby's, and it is the last known place of housing of this manuscript. The place of its actual housing is unknown.

See also 

 List of New Testament minuscules
 Biblical manuscript
 Textual criticism

References

Further reading 

 

Greek New Testament minuscules
13th-century biblical manuscripts
Lost biblical manuscripts